Chamoux may refer to:
Surnames
Benoît Chamoux, a French alpinist
François Chamoux, a French hellenist
Jean Chamoux, a French photographer

Places
Chamoux, a commune in the French département of Yonne, region of Bourgogne
Chamoux-sur-Gelon, a commune in the French département of Savoie